A three-part referendum was held in Liechtenstein on 30 August 2020. Voters were asked whether they approve of an initiative proposing changes to the constitution to promote the equal representation of women in political bodies, a parliament law allowing dual citizenship for naturalised citizens, and a decision by the government to fund a railway line expansion. All three proposals were rejected.

Background
The 'HalbeHalbe' (HalfHalf) popular initiative proposes inserting the text "The balanced representation of women and men in political bodies is promoted." to article 31, paragraph 2 of the constitution. The initiative was approved by the Landtag in November 2019, with organisers given six weeks to obtain the 1,500 signatures necessary for it to be discussed in the Landtag. Around 1,800 signatures were obtained, resulting in a debate in the Landtag on 4 March. A majority of members rejected the proposal, resulting in it proceeding to a referendum.

The dual citizenship proposal was put forward by the Free List in 2015, with the Landtag voting to require the government to amend legislation to allow dual citizenship for naturalised citizens by abolishing the requirement for them to give up their previous citizenship. The legislation was approved by the Landtag in March 2020, with members of parliament also voting to put the final decision to voters in a referendum.

A proposal to fund the  project - dual tracking of the Tisis–Nendeln railway track (which would allow the Swiss St. Gallen S-Bahn and Austrian Vorarlberg S-Bahn to merge into a regional network and increasing train frequency through Liechtenstein) was approved by the Landtag on 4 June 2020, with 18 members voting in favour. A majority of members also voted to put the final decision to voters in a referendum.

Campaign

Results
All three proposals were rejected by a majority of voters. Turnout was slightly over 82%.

References

2020 in Liechtenstein
Liechtenstein
Referendums in Liechtenstein